Quental is the surname of:

 Antero de Quental (1842–1891), Portuguese poet, philosopher, and writer
 Bartolomeu de Quental (1626–1698), Portuguese Catholic priest, theologian, and preacher
 Dulce Quental (born 1960), Brazilian singer and composer
 Geórgia Quental (1939–2022), Brazilian actress and model

See also
 Quintal (disambiguation)